Gerald Williams may refer to:

Gerald Williams (baseball) (1966–2022), former American Major League Baseball outfielder
Gerald Williams (American football) (born 1963), former American football defensive lineman
Gerald Williams (politician) (1903–1989), British politician
Gerald Williams (rugby league) (born 1969), South African international
Gerald Evan Williams (1907–1949), American Air Force officer
Gerald Williams (tennis commentator) (1929–2016), British sports commentator
Gerald Williams (artist), American artist

See also
Gerry Williams (disambiguation)
Gerard Williams (disambiguation)